Mount Nord Historic District (also Mt. Nord Historic District, formerly Mont Nord Addition) is a historic district in Fayetteville, Arkansas encompassing one city block with five properties. The properties were built between 1901 and 1925 in various architectural styles, and the area was listed on the National Register of Historic Places in 1982.

History
Fayetteville began booming after the Civil War with the establishment of the Arkansas Industrial University in 1871 and completion of the St. Louis - San Francisco Railway (Frisco) to the city. The railway also helped the growing apple and strawberry industries surrounding Fayetteville and began the growth of a timber industry. As a result, Fayetteville began to expand outward, including the Mont Nord Addition. The addition was platted in 1908 as the area bounded by Lafayette Street, Maple Street, Forest Avenue, and Mock Avenue. The name "Mont Nord" was taken from French to mean "North Mountain", as the addition was at the northern boundary of Fayetteville at the time. The district formerly included the Arkansas Building, a structure built in St. Louis Missouri for the 1904 World's Fair. Fayetteville businessman Artemus Wolf purchased the structure, had it disassembled, marked, shipped and rebuilt on his property in the Mont Nord Addition in 1905. This structure was demolished in 1939, leaving only the five properties along Mount Nord Street which compose the present-day district.

Properties
 1890 Mock-Fulbright House

 1900 Pritchard House

 1900 Bogart-Huntington House

 1905 Gulley House

 1920 Lawson House

See also

 University of Arkansas Campus Historic District
 Washington-Willow Historic District
 West Dickson Street Commercial Historic District
 Wilson Park Historic District

Notes

References

 

Historic districts on the National Register of Historic Places in Arkansas
Colonial Revival architecture in Arkansas
Beaux-Arts architecture in Arkansas
National Register of Historic Places in Fayetteville, Arkansas
Georgian Revival architecture in Arkansas
1901 establishments in Arkansas
Houses on the National Register of Historic Places in Arkansas